NW London Football Club is a football club based in Arkley, London, England.

History
NW London were formed in 2015 by Wasim Khan and Samir Naji from Cricklewood and Kilburn respectively. In 2017, the club entered the Middlesex County League system. NW London entered the FA Vase for the first time in 2019–20. The 2021-2022 season was a treble winning season in which the club captured the Middlesex Premier Division along with two cup competitions (Anagram Records Trophy & Middlesex Intermediate Cup).

Ground
The club currently groundshare with Hadley F.C. at Brickfield Lane.

Records
Best FA Vase performance: First qualifying round, 2019–20

References

Association football clubs established in 2015
2015 establishments in England
Football clubs in England
Football clubs in London
Sport in the London Borough of Barnet
Middlesex County Football League